The Lost Room is a 2006 science fiction television miniseries that aired on the Syfy Channel in the United States. The series revolves around the titular room and some of the everyday items from that room which possess unusual powers. The show's protagonist, Joe Miller, is searching for these objects to rescue his daughter, Anna, who has disappeared inside the Room. Once a typical room at a 1960s motel along U.S. Route 66, the Lost Room has existed outside of normal time and space since 1961, when what is referred to only as "the Event" took place.

Cast and characters 
 Peter Krause as Detective Joe Miller – A Pittsburgh detective who stumbles upon the existence of the Room. When his daughter becomes lost inside the Room, Joe sets out to get her back by using the Key to track down other Objects.
 Elle Fanning as Anna Miller – Joe's 8-year-old daughter. Her disappearance is seen by others as a probable family abduction by Joe in an ongoing child custody battle with his (unseen) ex-wife, Vanessa.
 Chris Bauer as Detective Lou Destefano – Joe's partner, whose murder in the story is blamed on Joe.
 April Grace as Detective Lee Bridgewater – Joe's friend at the police department. She is trying to clear Joe's name, and in so doing slowly discovers the powers held by the Room and its Objects.
 Dennis Christopher as Dr. Martin Ruber – A forensic scientist who works with Joe and who becomes obsessed with the Objects, going as far as killing in an attempt to get the Key. Through his obsession, he learns of and joins the Order of the Reunification, a cabal that believes the Objects are pieces of God and will allow direct communication with God if reunited as they were at the time of the Event.  By the end of the series, Ruber believes he has become the Prophet of the Objects after having a vision while staring at the Polaroid Object.
 Julianna Margulies as Jennifer Bloom – A member of the Legion, another cabal dedicated to finding all of the Objects and hiding them for the protection of humanity.  Jennifer tries to warn Joe of the inherent danger of the Room and the Objects therein. Her brother, Drew, became obsessed with the Objects, and Jennifer believes that something in Room 9 of the Motel "destroyed" him.
 Kevin Pollak as Karl Kreutzfeld – A former member of the Legion and collector of Objects. He owns a chain of dry-cleaning stores and several pawnshops that he uses to acquire Objects. Kreutzfeld claims to be searching for the Glass Eye to cure his son Isaac's leukemia.  Alternately an ally and an enemy to Joe.
 Peter Jacobson as Wally Jabrowski – A man who has the Bus Ticket and is effectively a drifter.  He has extensive knowledge about the Objects and their history.
 Ewen Bremner as Harold Stritzke – A voyeur who inherited the Comb from his aunt Barbara, a member of the Collectors. He has become very paranoid after being pursued by the Order and others who want his Object for themselves.
 Roger Bart as Howard "The Weasel" Montague – A former philosophy professor turned small-time criminal. He's an obsessed collector of Objects who charts the Objects' relations to one another and introduces the idea of the Prime Object.
 Chris McCarty as Milton Vrang – A former member of a Cabal and only living burn victim of the Pen.  He provides valuable and secret information to Dr. Martin Ruber on the mysterious and dangerous world of Objects and Object Seekers.
 Margaret Cho as Suzie Kang – A tough, chain-smoking, independent operator who works as an Object tracker, selling information about the locations of the Room's Objects. She never touches them, as she recognizes the dangers that the Objects carry. Suzie runs her Object-tracking business out of the back of her mother's dry-cleaning business. She charges a fortune for the information.
 Jason Antoon as The Sood – A seedy, Las Vegas-based dealer of Object "Science" – pictures, videos, and artifacts relating to Objects – but never Objects themselves.
 Jason Douglas as Anthony – The intimidating bodyguard, hitman, and head of Kreutzfeld's personal Secret Service-style security team.
 Hugo Perez as Pumeet – The Sood's ubiquitous manservant and bodyguard.
 Tim Guinee as The Occupant, formerly Eddie McCleister – The Occupant was removed from time and space during The Event that made the Lost Room, leaving only his personal belongings as "Objects".  Eddie no longer exists in time and there is no memory of his ever doing so, as even his wife has no recollection of him.  He resides in a sanitarium under the name "John Doe" until found by Joe.  Like the objects, he does not age, and cannot be damaged (hurt) in any way, so he himself is essentially one of the objects.
 Jorge Pallo as Ignacio "Iggy" Loca – Survivor of the pawn shop murders, temporarily holder of the Key, hands it to Detective Miller when dying.

Plot

The Room 
The Room is the now nonexistent Room 10 at the abandoned Sunshine Motel outside Gallup, New Mexico. At 1:20:44 p.m. on May 4, 1961, something happened at the site of the Room that erased it and all its contents. This is referred to as "the Event" or "the Incident", and is thought to be the reason for the unusual properties of the Room and the Objects from within it. At the time of the Event, the motel was in serviceable condition, but after the event nobody remembers that a tenth room ever existed. One of the Objects, the undeveloped Polaroid picture, allows a person to view the tenth room as it was at the time of the Event by standing at its now vacant location at the Sunshine Motel ruins.

The Room can be accessed only by the person who has the Key. The Key will open any hinged door with a pin tumbler lock anywhere in the world, turning that door into a portal accessing the Room regardless of where it would normally open into. As Joe Miller sees on the surveillance tape, when a door is opened using the key, it appears closed if viewed from the other side of that door. When exiting the Room, its door opens not necessarily to the original place of entry, but to any room the holder of the Key has in mind, or to a random room if the user does not focus. To reach a specific room the user must have a clear picture of the room's door and the area around it. The "Lost" Room thus serves as a means of instant travel between similar doors anywhere on Earth.  Hinged doors with types of locks other than a tumbler lock or with no lock at all, sliding doors and rotating doors cannot be used to access the Room.  The door used does not have to be installed in a wall and can be a smaller prop door or a freestanding doorway; the only important elements are the lock and that it be a hinged door.

Any time the door is closed with the key outside the room, the Room "resets": everything that is not an Object disappears, including people. Multiple people can enter the room at once, but they must exit the room when the Key does.  When the Room resets, any Objects in the Room will return to their original position at the time of the Event.  A benefit of this is that an Object enclosed within something else, such as a safe, may be retrieved by leaving it inside and resetting the room.  This can also be used to distinguish real Objects from fakes, since fakes will disappear.

Objects, when outside the Room, possess special powers and are indestructible. When inside the Room, Objects lose their special properties and can be destroyed.  According to the Occupant, a new Object will take the destroyed Object's place, a phenomenon he refers to as the Law of Conservation of Objects.  The Occupant states that there are many Rooms, and so any non-Object left in the Room is not erased, but exists in a different instance of the Room. The reset, in turn, represents a confluence of these Rooms, allowing the Occupant (the only Object with consciousness) to retrieve things lost during a reset, provided he has a clear idea of what he wishes to retrieve.

The Event 
The Event is a shorthand term given to the moment in time that the Lost Room was created. It occurred at 1:20:44 p.m. on May 4, 1961, and erased the room and all of its contents from history. The reason behind this and the ultimate purpose of the Objects is unknown, though two primary hypotheses have been postulated. Even the man occupying the room at the time of the event doesn't seem to know what happened, so the truth remains a mystery. Both hypotheses essentially lead to the same conclusion, but attribute the event to different causes.

One faction, the Order of the Reunification, operates under the belief that the Objects are pieces of God's mind or body, and that reuniting them will allow them to communicate with God. More extreme versions of this view hold that reuniting the Objects will turn one into God or at least give that person God-like powers. Martin Ruber purports that the Occupant confirmed this particular theory for him in a vision, making him the self-proclaimed "Prophet of the Objects", but his near-death state from dehydration and heat exhaustion at the time casts doubt on his claims.  Additionally, the Occupant himself shows no knowledge of the circumstances behind the event.  The Deck of Cards, which gives one who is exposed to it a vision of the events during the Collectors' failed attempt to use the objects on Room 9 of the hotel, may be the source of their beliefs, as it is used in their rituals.

Another (though not necessarily contradictory) view of the phenomenon suggests that reality was somehow shattered at the location of the Room, thus separating it and everything in it from time and giving its contents metaphysical abilities.  Should the items be collected and returned to the room by an individual, that person would then have complete control over reality. This theory works under the assumption that the one gathering the objects has the knowledge to utilize them properly. Since the Objects are just considered tools, they would do no good if the user were unaware of their paranormal functions.

The Objects 
The Objects are powerful artifacts and consist of roughly 100 everyday items one would expect to find in an occupied motel room in the 1960s. They are indestructible (except when inside the Room) and possess various other-worldly powers when taken outside the Lost Room, but do not work within the Room itself. According to the Occupant (Eddie McCleister), when an object is destroyed within the room, another object takes its place. Whether the new object takes the former's properties partially or totally is unknown. Various characters repeatedly put forth the opinion that, over time, Objects lead to something akin to bad karma or bad luck for their owners. All of the items (including the occupant) attract one another, wanting to come together. The Occupant states that the objects are aware of each other, constantly sending out pings to each other and that for a living mind this is torture; the Occupant was eventually found when a search of the recorded history of other Objects revealed a small circular area where the Objects had never been detected, representing the area where the Occupant had resided for years.

The Cabals 
Many Object-seekers have organized themselves into groups, known as "cabals". Wars between cabals are mentioned in the series. There are at least three cabals:

 The Collectors  The original group of Object-seekers formed some time after the Event.  Led by Arlene Conroy, the manager of the Sunshine Motel, most of the Collectors were killed or driven insane after the disaster in Room 9 in 1966.  The survivors hid their most important Objects in a place called "The Collector's Vault", buried in a fallout shelter beneath an abandoned prison.
 The Legion  A cabal dedicated to collecting the Objects and stopping them from causing more harm.  They claim to follow an established set of rules, including that they never kill in order to acquire the Objects, although this rule is sometimes put to the test.
 The Order of the Reunification  Also referred to as "The Order" or "The New Religion".  They believe that the Objects are pieces of God and must be reunited.  Once so restored, members of the Order would be able to communicate with God for the first time in human history.  Unlike the Legion, The Order have no qualms about killing.

Episodes

DVD release 

The miniseries is presented as six "one-hour" (44 minute) episodes, rather than as three "two-hour" episodes as originally broadcast. These are named "The Key", "The Clock", "The Comb", "The Box", "The Eye", and "The Occupant". The DVD also includes an 18-minute-long making-of featurette, "Inside The Lost Room", with comments from the writers and actors.

Reception 
The Lost Room received mixed reviews, scoring 58 out of 100 on Metacritic. Positive reviews included Mike Duffy of the Detroit Free Press who called it "a terrific, six-hour miniseries, beautifully written and sharply directed." David Hinckley of the New York Daily News called it "a very complex metaphysical mystery, the enjoyment of which comes, in no small part, from the surprises that spill out as it slowly unfurls." Negative reviews came from Matt Roush of TV Guide, calling it "an especially silly descent into incoherence."

The miniseries received two Emmy Award nominations, for Outstanding Main Title Design and Outstanding Sound Mixing for a Miniseries or a Movie. It was nominated for Best Presentation on Television at the 33rd Saturn Awards. Writers Laura Harkcom, Christopher Leone, and Paul Workman were nominated for a 2008 Writers Guild of America Award.

Canceled comic book continuation 
In July 2010, the series' creators announced at the 2010 San Diego Comic-Con International that Red 5 Comics will be publishing a sequel, in comic book form, to The Lost Room. Publication was expected in late summer or early autumn 2011. The January 2012 update from Red 5 states that although production of the comic has "slowed" due to the creators being pulled into other projects, Red 5 Comics is still "100% committed to completing this comic". As of April 2013, the project has been put on hold indefinitely.

See also
Locke & Key - Later work from 2008 with a very similar main concept to The Lost Room, a set of magical objects with different properties including a key that opens any door to anywhere.
SCP Foundation
Warehouse 13
Friday the 13th: The Series
Control (video game) - 2019 video game dealing with mundane objects gaining metaphysical powers, as well as a mysterious hotel serving as a link between some objects

References

External links 

 

2000s American science fiction television series
2006 American television series debuts
2006 American television series endings
2000s American television miniseries
Fictional rooms
Television series about parallel universes
Syfy original programming
Television series by Lionsgate Television